The 2018–19 Mestis season is the 19th season of Mestis, the second highest level of ice hockey in Finland after Liiga. KOOVEE was promoted from Suomi-sarja due to Espoo United declaring bankruptcy at the end of last season.

Clubs

Regular season
Top eight advance to the Mestis playoffs while the bottom two face the top two teams from Suomi-sarja for a relegation playoff. Since the highest series of Finnish hockey is a closed series no team will be promoted to Liiga.

Rules for classification: 1) Points; 2) Goal difference; 3) Goals scored; 4) Head-to-head points; 5) Penalty minutes.

Playoffs
Playoffs are being played in three stages. Each stage is a best-of-7 series. The teams are reseeded after the quarterfinals, so that the best team by regular season performance to make the semifinals faces the worst team in the semifinals.

Bracket

Quarterfinals

Semifinals

Bronze medal game

Finals 

Ketterä wins the finals 4-1.

Relegation playoffs
The bottom two teams faced the top two teams from Suomi-sarja for a best-of-7 series were the winners got a place in Mestis for the next season. Peliitat and KOOVEE both won their series and thus avoided relegation.

See also
 2018–19 Liiga season

References

Mestis seasons
Mestis
Mestis
Finland